Zachery Reed Kelly (born March 3, 1995) is an American professional baseball pitcher for the Boston Red Sox of Major League Baseball (MLB). He made his MLB debut in 2022.

Career

Amateur career
Kelly graduated from Lord Botetourt High School in Daleville, Virginia. He enrolled at Concord University, where he played college baseball in NCAA Division II for the Concord Mountain Lions as a starting pitcher in 2014. After his sophomore year, Kelly transferred to Newberry College, to play for the Newberry Wolves, their Division II baseball team. As a senior in 2017, Kelly had a 3.72 earned run average (ERA) and recorded 94 strikeouts in  innings pitched.

Oakland Athletics
Unselected in the 2017 MLB draft, Kelly signed with the Oakland Athletics as an undrafted free agent for a $500 signing bonus. He pitched in the rookie-level Arizona League during 2017. The Athletics released Kelly in April 2018. Kelly later said, "My first year I probably paid to play to be honest with you. I definitely lost money."

Los Angeles Angels
Kelly signed with the Los Angeles Angels organization and played for three teams in the Angels' system, reaching the Class A-Advanced level with the Inland Empire 66ers of the California League; in 18 total relief appearances during the season, he posted a 2.93 ERA and struck out 41 batters in 43 innings pitched. Kelly began the 2019 season with the Mobile BayBears of the Double-A Southern League, and also played one game with Inland Empire, accruing an overall 3–7 record in 21 games (13 starts) with a 4.88 ERA. The Angels released Kelly during the COVID-19 shutdown in 2020. Shortly thereafter, Kelly underwent surgery on his elbow to have a ligament reattached.

Boston Red Sox
In 2021, Kelly joined the Red Sox organization, playing for the Double-A Portland Sea Dogs and the Triple-A Worcester Red Sox. He had a 1.69 ERA in 21 relief appearances for Portland before he was promoted to Worcester, where he had a 2.89 ERA in 15 relief appearances. In 2022, the Red Sox invited Kelly to spring training as a non-roster player and he returned to Worcester for the beginning of the season. He accrued a 2.72 ERA for Worcester through August 29, when he was added to Boston's major-league roster. Kelly made his MLB debut that evening, against the Minnesota Twins. He was on the paternity list for three days in early September. In 13 relief appearances with Boston, Kelly pitched to a 1–0 record with 3.95 ERA while striking out 11 batters in  innings. Kelly was the 2022 recipient of the Lou Gorman Award issued by the Red Sox organization.

Personal life
Kelly is married and resides in South Carolina in the offseason. He and his wife, Brittany, had their first child in September 2022.

References

External links

Living people
1995 births
Sportspeople from Roanoke, Virginia
Baseball players from Virginia
Major League Baseball pitchers
Boston Red Sox players
Arizona League Athletics players
Burlington Bees players
Orem Owlz players
Inland Empire 66ers of San Bernardino players
Mobile BayBears players
Portland Sea Dogs players
Worcester Red Sox players
Concord Mountain Lions baseball players
Newberry Wolves baseball players